Hemiplatytes parallela is a moth in the family Crambidae. It was described by William D. Kearfott in 1908. It is found in the US states of Arizona and New Mexico.

References

Ancylolomiini
Moths described in 1908
Moths of North America